Ali Lotfi Ibrahim Mostafa Swidan (born 14 October 1989) is an Egyptian footballer who plays as a goalkeeper for Al Ahly in the Egyptian Premier League.

On April 18, 2021, he saved a penalty and a last minute header from Mahmoud Alaa and Al Ahly went on to win the Cairo derby against Zamalek 2-1.

Honours
Al Ahly
 Egyptian Premier League: 2017–18, 2018–19, 2019–20
 Egypt Cup: 2019–20
 Egyptian Super Cup: 2018, 2021
 CAF Champions League: 2019–20, 2020-21
 FIFA Club World Cup: Third-Place 2020, Third-Place 2021
 CAF Super Cup: 2021 (May), 2021 (December)

References

External links

1989 births
Living people
Egyptian footballers
Egypt international footballers
Association football goalkeepers
ENPPI SC players
Al Ahly SC players
Egyptian Premier League players
Footballers from Cairo